Onno Boelee (1945–2013) was a Dutch-New Zealand actor, stuntman and professional wrestler. Although he never won a championship title, he was a popular star in Steve Rickard's All Star-Pro Wrestling, frequently appearing on Rickard's wrestling programme On the Mat and later in Japan for Giant Baba and All-Japan Pro Wrestling during the early to mid-1970s.

After his retirement in 1976, Boelee achieved some success as a character actor and stuntman during the 1980s, especially in Hong Kong action cinema, and eventually founded a private security company which is involved in stunt performance, armoury and acting within the New Zealand film and television industry. He is also the younger brother of artist Rudolf Boelee.

Career
Boelee was born in Rotterdam during the hunger winter to Anneke and Bram Boelee, an electrical engineer. His older brother Rudolf (born 1940) emigrated to New Zealand in 1963, and Onno followed him a year later at the age of 18. Onno became a bouncer for the well-known Shantytown night club in Queen Street, Auckland. Rudolf painted a portrait of Onno which was displayed at Shantytown for many years. When the occasional patron became upset with his brother, according to Rudolf, they would throw their drink at the painting rather than at him.

Boelee began training at a gym in Mount Roskill for a career in professional wrestling. He made his debut in 1970 working for Ernie Pinchers and South Pacific Wrestling. A year later, he joined Steve Rickard's All Star-Pro Wrestling and toured the country for the next five years. In one of his most memorable matches, he and partners Frank Lipanovich and Bronco Barnes took on the 490 pound André the Giant and "Kiwi" Johnny Frazer in a three-on-two handicap match at the sold-out Auckland YMCA in 1972; this was André the Giant's official debut in New Zealand. Boelee was also invited to Japan where he appeared for Giant Baba and All-Japan Pro Wrestling from September–November 1974.

In 1975, Boelee was among the many native New Zealanders to appear on Rickard's wrestling programme On the Mat. During its first two years, he was one of the show's first stars with bouts against some of the top names in New Zealand including "Wild" Don Scott, Jock Ruddock, Merve Fortune, Del Adams, Robert Bruce, King Curtis Iaukea, Teddy Williams, Butch Miller, Bruno Bekkar, Johnny Garcia, Al Hobman and John da Silva, and international stars Big Bad John, Abdullah the Butcher, Bulldog Brower, Mark Lewin, Waldo Von Erich, and The Sheik.

Following his retirement from the wrestling business, Boelee tried his hand at acting. He found some success in local independent films with roles in Prisoners (1981), Other Halves (1984) and Second Time Lucky (1984). His brief foray into the Hong Kong action cinema genre, however, saw a rise in his career with supporting roles in Mad Mission 4: You Never Die Twice and Legacy of Rage (1986). He also starred in director Garth Maxwell's 1988 independent film Beyond Gravity before taking a break from acting for the next several years.

Boelee eventually started a successful private security company which became involved in stunt performance, armoury and acting in the New Zealand film and television industry. In 1994, after a six-year absence, Boelee appeared as Gargan the Giant in the television movie Hercules and the Lost Kingdom. He also had a minor role in the 2000 independent short film Sci-Fi Betty, guest starred on the children's TV series Power Rangers Dino Thunder in 2004, and on both Maddigan's Quest and Street Legal in 2006. In recent years, his security company has participated in the productions of Crooked Earth and Orange Roughies.

Boelee was also among the many veteran New Zealand wrestlers who attended a "legends reunion" show at Petone and was later interviewed by Kiwi Pro Wrestling in 2007.

Filmography and TV roles

References

External links

Onno Boelee at Hong Kong Cinemagic
Onno Boelee at Hong Kong Movie DataBase

1945 births
2013 deaths
Dutch emigrants to New Zealand
New Zealand male professional wrestlers
New Zealand male film actors
New Zealand male television actors
People from Auckland
Entertainers from Rotterdam